Bocca di Navene is a mountain saddle in the Monte Baldo range in the Garda Mountains in northern Italy. The saddle separates the more solitary Monte Altissimo di Nago (2078 m) in the north from the rest of the range with the long ridge with Cima Valdritta (2292 m) in the south. On the western side a steep hiking path leads down to lake Garda, while at the eastern side the slopes are more gentle and fall down to the small barrier lake Lago di Prà della Stua.

Bocca di Navene is also at the border between the Italian provinces of Trentino and Veneto.

Tourism 
The highway Strada Provinciale del Monte Baldo leads over the saddle and there is a mountain hut Rifugio Bocca di Navene directly at the saddle point.

See also
 List of highest paved roads in Europe
 List of mountain passes

Mountain passes of the Alps
Mountain passes of Italy